The Nangarhar offensive was a 21-day military offensive in February and March 2016, carried out by the Afghan government against the Islamic State of Iraq and the Levant – Khorasan Province (ISIL-K), with the assistance of ISAF and U.S airstrikes. When the offensive ended, ISIL had reportedly lost all of its territory in Afghanistan and had been expelled from the country.

Background
ISIL-K was formed in January 2015 after the group pledged its allegiance to Abu Bakr al-Baghdadi and the Islamic State. Early estimates of membership ranged from around 60 to 70 with most fighters coming across the border from Pakistan. Within the first year, membership had grown to between 1,000 and 3,000 militants, mainly defectors from the Afghan and the Pakistani Taliban. Their territory was generally confined to the Nangarhar Province.

In January 2016, the U.S. government sent a directive to The Pentagon which granted new legal authority for the U.S. military to go on the offensive against ISIL-K. For 3 weeks in January the U.S. military carried out at least a dozen operations, including raids by special operations forces and airstrikes, many of these taking place in the Tora Bora region of Nangarhar Province. American commanders believe that between 90 and 100 Islamic State militants had been killed in these operations. On 1 February, U.S. airstrikes in Nangarhar province killed 29 ISIS fighters and struck the terrorist group's FM radio station. By 11 February, ABC news reported the U.S. military had carried out 20 airstrikes on ISIS in eastern Afghanistan in the previous 3 weeks.

The offensive
The offensive began on 14 February, when Afghan soldiers with the aide of US drone strikes managed to kill at least 28 ISIL militants in Kot and Achin districts. During the attacks, two civilians were killed. Four days later, Afghan security forces continued their operations pushing ISIL back into Achin, killing a number of fighters.

On 21 February, Afghan security forces under the lead of Brigadier Gen. Mohammad Nasim Sangin captured the Achin district. On 22 February, Afghan security forces reportedly killed 18 ISIS militants, whilst a further 25 ISIS militants were killed in a drone strike as they were preparing to attack an Afghan security posts in the Pekha Khwar area of Achin district; additionally, a large quantity of weapons and ammunition belonging to the terrorist group was destroyed.

The operation was aided by local civilians who set up checkpoints to help maintain security in their villages. The fighters later supplemented the Afghan government forces in a more active combat role.
 
On 6 March the Afghan president claimed that government forced had successfully recaptured all Afghan territory held by ISIL. The final battle took place in the Shinwar District on the previous day. Afghan government sources reported that at least 200 ISIL fighters had been killed in the fighting. On the same day, a U.S. Drone strike in the Achin district reportedly killed 15 Islamic State militants.

Aftermath
On March 15, 2016, an official confirmed that IS militants had moved north from Nangarhar into Chahar Dara district of Kunduz province. ISIL-K still has a small presence in one of Nangarhar's districts and is confined to it and on March 16, 2016, they attacked an Afghan police checkpoint in the province.

References

2016 in Afghanistan
Battles involving Afghanistan
Military operations involving the Islamic State of Iraq and the Levant
Conflicts in 2016
History of Nangarhar Province
Military operations of the War in Afghanistan (2001–2021)
February 2016 events in Afghanistan
March 2016 events in Afghanistan